The South Dakota Republican Party is the affiliate of the Republican Party in South Dakota. It is currently the dominant party in the state, controlling South Dakota's at-large U.S. House seat, both U.S. Senate seats, the governorship, and has supermajorities in both houses of the state legislature.

Current elected officials

The South Dakota Republican Party controls all ten statewide offices and holds majorities in the South Dakota Senate and the South Dakota House of Representatives. Republicans also hold both of the state's U.S. Senate seats and the state's at-large congressional seat.

Federal

U.S. Senate

U.S. House of Representatives

State
Governor: Kristi Noem
Lieutenant Governor: Larry Rhoden
Secretary of State: Steve Barnett

State Auditor: Steve Barnett
State Treasurer: Rich Sattgast
Commissioner of School and Public Lands: Ryan Brunner
Public Utilities Commissioner: Kristie Fiegen
Public Utilities Commissioner: Chris Nelson
Public Utilities Commissioner: Gary Hanson

See also
South Dakota Democratic Party

References

External links
South Dakota Republican Party

Republican Party
South Dakota